Six Degrees Architects is an Australian architectural practice based in Melbourne, Victoria. It was formed in 1991 by six architecture graduates sharing a studio in Richmond.

The "Six Degrees" name was inspired by the Nylex Clock in Richmond, which displayed a cold 6 °C one night. The name also circumvented the requirement for architectural registration in the early years of their practice, and was a reflection of the status of the six partners having six Bachelor of Architecture degrees. Recycled and salvaged materials became part of their architectural language. This approach played out in their self-funded project, Meyers Place Bar, which later received the inaugural Melbourne Prize.

Notable Projects
Meyers Place, Melbourne, 1993

Public Office, West Melbourne, 1997

Wall 280, Balaklava, Melbourne, 1999

Kooyong Lawn Tennis Club, 2000

Pelican, St. Kilda, Melbourne, 2002

School of Architecture, University of Tasmania, Launceston, 2007

Vaults Precinct, Melbourne, 2008

St Mary's House of Welcome, 2010

The Boatbuilders Yard, South Wharf, Southbank, Melbourne 2011

References

Companies based in Melbourne